Garfield is an unincorporated community in Frederick County, Maryland, United States, situated within the District 6, Catoctin.

Garfield appears on the Myersville U.S. Geological Survey Map and is located in the Eastern Time Zone.

Garfield United Methodist Church 
One of the few structures in Garfield is the Garfield United Methodist Church. It is relatively small and is located on Stottlemeyer Road.

References

Populated places in Frederick County, Maryland